Ritch Brinkley (March 18, 1944 – November 5, 2015) was an American character actor who appeared in over 50 films and television programs in a career that spanned three decades. He is best known for playing William in Beauty and the Beast and cameraman Carl Wishnitski on Murphy Brown, as well as for roles in films such as Cabin Boy (1994) and Breakdown.

Brinkley died on November 5, 2015, at age 71.

Filmography 
Film

Television

References

External links 
 
 Ritch Brinkley at the New York Times
 Obituary

1944 births
2015 deaths
American male film actors
American male television actors
Male actors from Texas
Place of death missing
People from Colorado City, Texas